The High Above and the Down Below is the seventh studio album by contemporary folk singer–songwriter Cliff Eberhardt.  It was released on Red House Records on April 10, 2007.  It is Eberhardt's first album in five years and follows a lengthy recovery from serious injuries Eberhardt suffered in a 2002 auto accident.

Recording
The album was recorded live-in-studio and produced by Eric Peltoniemi.  Only a few overdubs were added (mostly doubling Eberhardt's own slide guitar work to his own guitar playing).  Eberhardt says, "This is the recording that I always wanted to make."  The musicians featured include Eberhardt (vocals & guitars), Richard Dworsky (piano, B3, Rhodes), Gordy Johnson (basses), and J. T. Bates (drums).

Reception

The album received favorable reviews, and made at least one critic's list of best albums of the year.  The album debuted at #12, on the Folk Radio Airplay chart for April 2007.

Track listing
All songs written by Cliff Eberhardt
 "The High Above and the Down Below" - 3:14
 "Missing You" - 2:43
 "It's Home Everywhere I Go" - 3:28
 "The Next Big Thing" - 3:15
 "The Right Words" - 4:52
 "After the Rain Falls" - 2:14
 "Assembly Line" - 3:55
 "Dug Your Own Grave" - 2:57
 "Let This Whole Thing Burn" - 3:18
 "New Is What's Come Over You" - 4:04
 "I'm All Right" - 2:34
 "Goodbye Again" - 3:09

Credits

Musicians
 Cliff Eberhardt - vocals & acoustic & electric guitars
 Richard Dworsky - piano, Hammond B3 organ, Rhodes piano
 Gordy Johnson - electric and acoustic bass
 J. T. Bates - drums and percussion
 Matt Zimmermann - congas on "After the Rain Falls"

Production
 Produced by Eric Peltoniemi
 recorded, mixed, and mastered by Mathew Zimmerman at Wild Sound, Minneapolis, Minnesota
Assisted by Gerard Boissy
Additional input from Chris Frymire

Artwork
Photography - Jim Herrington
Layout and design - Eric Peltoniemi
Cover concept - Cliff Eberhardt

Other
Bookings - Steve Lindquist
Management - Stephen Garvan/Garvan Management

Charts

Releases

External links
 The High Above and the Down Below, page at Red House Records

References

2007 albums
Cliff Eberhardt albums
Red House Records albums